Bagpipe Blues is the first album by the piper and saxophonist Rufus Harley, recorded in 1965 and released on the Atlantic label.

Reception

Allmusic awarded the album 4 stars.

Track listing 
 "Bagpipe Blues" (Rufus Harley) - 2:41
 "Kerry Dancers" (traditional) - 5:34
 "Who Can I Turn To (When Nobody Needs Me)" (Leslie Bricusse, Anthony Newley) - 3:58
 "More" (Riz Ortolani, Nino Oliviero, Norman Newell) - 6:39
 "Chim Chim Cher-ee" (Robert B. Sherman, Richard M. Sherman) - 2:26
 "Sportin'" (Rufus Harley) - 5:04
 "Sometimes I Feel Like a Motherless Child" (traditional) - 5:34

Personnel 
Rufus Harley - bagpipes, flute, soprano saxophone, tenor saxophone
Oliver Collins - piano
James Glenn - double bass
Billy Abner - drums

References 

1965 debut albums
Atlantic Records albums
Rufus Harley albums
Albums produced by Joel Dorn